Sister Hazel is the self-titled debut studio album by Sister Hazel.  It has also been referred to as White. The album was originally released in 1994 and re-released in 2005. While no singles were released from the album, it does contain an early acoustic version of what would become their first hit, "All for You".

Track listing 
 "Feel It" - 4:39
 "Sometimes" - 5:19
 "All for You" - 3:24
 "Will Not Follow" - 4:10
 "One Nation" - 3:44
 "Used to Run" - 3:23
 "Little Things" - 4:47
 "Space Between Us" - 5:03
 "Don't Think It's Funny" - 3:39
 "Running Through the Fields" - 4:57
 "Bring It on Home (to Me)" - 2:29

Personnel 
Ken Block – lead vocals, acoustic guitar
Jett Beres – bass, harmony vocals
Andrew Copeland – rhythm guitar, vocals
Ryan Newell – lead and slide guitar, harmony vocals
Mark Trojanowski – drums

References 

1994 debut albums
Sister Hazel albums